Photography in Serbia has its beginning in the mid-19th century, with the pioneer, regarded the first Serbian photographer, Anastas Jovanović (1817–1899).

References

Sources